David A. Kier was the ninth Principal Deputy Director of the National Reconnaissance Office (PDDNRO). He is a 1965 graduate of Washington & Jefferson College.

References

National Reconnaissance Office personnel
Living people
Washington & Jefferson College alumni
Year of birth missing (living people)